Hydrema is a dump truck manufacturer based in Støvring, Denmark, founded in 1959. They have specialized in the manufacture of articulated light dump trucks and earth moving equipment. A variety of models are produced, with a payload of up to 20 tonnes. Since 1996 they are also producing a mine clearing vehicle. A company subsidiary with production is operating in Weimar, Germany.

History 

In 1959 Aksel Kyed and Kjeld W. Jensen started the company "Kyed and Werner Jensen", which at that time were involved in two different projects, district heating and the fabrication of hydraulic digging equipment.

In 1960 the company was split, and Kjeld W. Jensen started Hydrema. Back then the headquarters were placed in Aalborg.

In 1962 the company moved to Støvring. At that time Hydrema had 15 workers and an area of 320 m².

In 1971 a daughter company was established in Norway, followed by Sweden in 1979, the former West Germany in 1981, England in 1985 and France in 1988. There are many countries like the United States, Australia and Poland, that import machines from the Hydrema factories in Denmark and from 1997 Germany.

In 1980 Hydrema started producing their own machines from the bottom. It started with the Hydrema 800-series, which were a new line of backhoe loaders produced all by themselves.  But the engines were made by Perkins Engines in England (Today most machines are fitted with Cummins engines, though).  Before 1980, Hydrema bought tractors from companies like Volvo, so they could mount their own hydraulic equipment on the tractors.

In 1983 Hydrema started producing their own dump trucks and in a short period in the late 1980s they also produced mobile building cranes.

In 1990 the Hydrema 800-series were replaced by the Hydrema 900-series which had a new chassis and more powerful axles and digging arm (backhoe).

In 1996 Hydrema started the production of a new mine clearing vehicle, named the Hydrema MCV 910. It can safely clear big mine areas in a short time.

In 1997 Hydrema bought the Weimar-Werk Baumaschinen and thereby got production facilities in Germany. In Støvring, the production and administration area is about 16.500 m², while the facilities in Weimar are 20.000 m².

In 1998 Hydrema launched their unique Hydrema MPV 900. It is a Multi Purpose Vehicle, which is able to switch whole tools, like a telescopic arm or a digging arm.

In 2004, Hydrema mine-clearing vehicle (MCV) was used by the Indian Army for 'proving' operations to clear personnel or anti-tank mines with up to 10 kg explosive weight.

In 2006 Hydrema expanded into the defence industry through a counter purchasing deal with the Swedish Hägglunds, which is a part of BAE Systems. Hydrema was to produce, mount and integrate 45 turrets for the Danish Army's new CV9035 Infantry Fighting Vehicle.

Products 

 Hydrema 912F - FS - HM Dumper
 Hydrema 922G Dumper
 Hydrema MX14 excavator
 Hydrema MX16 excavator
 Hydrema MX18 excavator
 Hydrema 900F backhoe loaders
 Hydrema 910MCV mine clearing vehicle

References 

Lastauto-Omnibus Katalog 2007, ETM Verlag.

External links

http://www.hydrema.com
http://www.hydrema.co.uk
http://www.terranis.be
Danish Hydrema 910 MCV

Construction equipment manufacturers of Denmark
Vehicle manufacturing companies established in 1959
Danish companies established in 1959
Danish brands